The Global War on Terrorism Service Medal (GWOT-SM) is a military award of the United States Armed Forces which was created through Executive Order 13289 on 12 March 2003, by President George W. Bush. The medal recognizes those military service members who have supported operations to counter terrorism in the War on Terror from 11 September 2001, to a date yet to be determined.

From its creation in March 2003 through September 2022, the GWOT-SM was a quasi-automatically awarded medal similar to the National Defense Service Medal (NDSM). The GWOT-SM was awarded for the broadly defined criterion of "support duty" to nearly all servicemembers after thirty days of post-entry training active service. However, effective September 11, 2022, the GWOT-SM is now awarded to servicemembers only serving in the area of effect for approved campaigns related to the Global War on Terrorism.

Background
In September 2002, the U.S. Department of Defense sent a request to the U.S. Army Institute of Heraldry to provide a design for a Global War on Terrorism Service Medal. In January 2003, a design was completed, which was then approved and made official in March 2003.

According to the U.S. Department of Defense, the Global War on Terrorism Service Medal will cease being awarded when Presidential Proclamation 7463, "Declaration of National Emergency by Reason of Certain Terrorist Attacks", delivered on 14 September 2001, is terminated by the U.S. government. It was most recently extended in 2022 until 2023.

Operations
The following are the approved operations for the Global War on Terrorism Service Medal:

The Coast Guard awards the medal for different operations (qv).

Criteria
To receive the Global War on Terrorism Service Medal, a military service member must have served on active duty during a designated anti-terrorism operation for a minimum 30 consecutive or 60 non-consecutive days. For those who were engaged in combat, killed, or wounded in the line of duty the time requirement is waived. By July 2022, the Department of Defense updated the criteria to remove this requirement, and instead awarding it to servicemembers who were deployed to approved campaigns or within 12-miles of a country's shoreline where an ongoing campaign is being undertaken.

The initial authorized operation for the Global War on Terrorism Service Medal was the so-called "Airport Security Operation" which occurred between 27 September 2001 and 31 May 2002. Additional operations, for which the Global War on Terrorism Service Medal is authorized, include the active military campaigns of Operation Enduring Freedom, Operation Noble Eagle, and Operation Iraqi Freedom.  Future operations are at the discretion of United States component commanders upon approval from the United States Department of Defense.

Support duty
In 2004, Defense Department and military service branches began publishing directives, messages, and orders, specifying that the Global War on Terrorism Service Medal would be awarded not only for direct participation in specific operations, but also to any personnel who performed support duty of an anti-terrorism operation but did not directly participate.  The phrase "support" was further defined as any administrative, logistics, planning, operational, technical, or readiness activity, which provides support to an operation of the Global War on Terrorism. As a result of this blanket term, the Global War on Terrorism Service Medal became an eligible award for most personnel of the United States Armed Forces who performed service after 11 September 2001 through March 2004.

With the orders granting the GWOT-SM for broadly-defined "support duty", awarding of the medal has essentially become practically automatic, akin to being a similar type of award as the National Defense Service Medal (graduates of training schools, ROTC, and service academies are typically presented both awards at the same time). The primary difference between the NDSM and the GWOT-SM is that the NDSM is automatic as soon as a person joins the military whereas the GWOTSM may only be presented after thirty days of active duty in a unit (or three months in the case of the Reserve Component). The regulations for Reservists and National Guardsmen are also not as well defined for the GWOT-SM as they are for the NDSM, since the presentation of the NDSM to reservists and National Guardsmen was codified and clarified as far back as the Persian Gulf War. Widely called the ''support'' loophole, the Department of Defense rescinded this eligibility requirement.

Army
The U.S. Army's regulations state that all soldiers "on active duty, including Reserve Component Soldiers mobilized, or Army National Guard Soldiers activated on or after 11 September 2001 to a date to be determined having served 30 consecutive days or 60 nonconsecutive days are authorized the GWOTSM."
The GWOT-SM was awarded automatically to all service members on Active Duty between 11 September 2001 and 31 March 2004. While the award is no longer automatic, the termination "date to be determined" has not been set. The Battalion Commander is the approval authority for the GWOT-SM. Service members are still eligible for the medal provided they meet the criteria in AR 600-8-22.

U.S. Army soldiers serving on active duty primarily in a training status (basic training, advanced individual training, officer training courses, etc....) are not authorized award of the GWOT-SM for the active duty time they are in training.  The criteria for the awards specifically states that a Soldier has to serve on active duty in support of a designated GWOT operation (Operation Noble Eagle [ONE], Operation Enduring Freedom [OEF], Operation Iraqi Freedom [OIF], Operation New Dawn [OND], Operation Inherent Resolve [OIR], and Operation Freedom's Sentinel [OFS]) for 30 consecutive days or 60 nonconsecutive days. Army soldiers in a training status are not considered to be supporting these designated operations.

Navy, Marine Corps, and Military Sealift Command
Regulations for rating the GWOT-SM are the same in the Navy, the Marine Corps, and Military Sealift Command for those who serve on both active duty, reserve duty, and support.  Essentially, 30 days of consecutive duty or 60 days of non-consecutive duty in support of approved organizations. Eligibility begins when they reach their first permanent duty station.  Civilian Mariners (CIVMARs) attached to Military Sealift Command's supply ships may be eligible for the Global War on Terrorism Civilian Service Medal.  Beginning 11 September 2022, the Marine Corps will be limiting the award of the GWOT-SM to "service members who directly serve in a designated military counter-terrorism (CT) operation (e.g., deployed on orders for a designated CT operation; directly supported a designated CT operation on a full-time basis while assigned to an organization conducting such a CT operation) for a minimum of 30 days (consecutive or non-consecutive)."

Air Force
Air Force service members were first awarded the GWOT-SM for conducting airport security operations in the fall and winter of 2001. It was subsequently awarded for participation or support of Operations Noble Eagle, Enduring Freedom, and Iraqi Freedom.  Members must be assigned, attached or mobilized to a unit participating in or serving in support of these designated operations for thirty consecutive days or sixty nonconsecutive days.  Personnel who are not deployed may be eligible for service in support of the Global War on Terrorism.  Examples of these duties are maintaining and loading weapons systems for combat missions, securing installations against terrorism, augmenting command posts or crisis action teams, and processing personnel for deployment.

Coast Guard
Coast Guard regulations concerning the award of the GWOT-SM, "From 11 September 2001 to 30 January 2005": Awarded to all Coast Guard active duty and reserve members on active duty during the eligibility period. To qualify, members must have served on active duty for a period of not less than 30 consecutive days or 60 non-consecutive days following initial accession point training. Service while assigned to training duty as a student, cadet, officer candidate, and duty under instruction (DUINS), does not count toward eligibility. This includes both training and summer cruises for the U.S. Coast Guard Academy and Officer Candidate School. For reservists, "active duty" includes ADT and IDT service in an operational vice classroom setting.

From 31 January 2005 to a date to be determined: Eligible service members must be or have been assigned, attached, or mobilized to a unit participating in or serving in direct support of specified Global War on Terrorism operations (e.g., NOBLE EAGLE, LIBERTY SHIELD, NEPTUNE SHIELD, PORT SHIELD, ENDURING FREEDOM, IRAQI FREEDOM, or Area Commander-designated GWOT operations) for 30 consecutive or 60 cumulative days, or meet one of the following criteria:
(a) Be engaged in actual combat regardless of time served in the operation; or
(b) While participating in the operation, regardless of time, be killed, wounded, or injured requiring medical evacuation."

Appearance
The medal is a bronze color metal disc 1.25 inches in diameter.  The obverse depicts an eagle with spread wings.  On the breast of the eagle is a shield of thirteen vertical bars.  In the eagle's right claw is an olive branch and in the left claw are three arrows.  The eagle is surmounted by a terrestrial globe with the inscription above "WAR ON TERRORISM SERVICE MEDAL." On the reverse is a laurel wreath on a plain field.  The medal is suspended from an Old Glory Blue ribbon 1.375 inches wide with stripes of golden yellow, scarlet and white.

Devices
Only one award of this medal may be authorized for any individual, thus no bronze or silver  inch service stars are prescribed for second or subsequent awards.

Battle stars
Although qualifying circumstances would be extremely rare, bronze  inch battle stars were applicable for personnel who were engaged in actual combat against the enemy involving grave danger of death or serious bodily injury. Only a Combatant Command could initiate a request for a GWOT-SM (or Global War on Terrorism Expeditionary Medal) battle star. This request would have contained the specific unit(s) or individual(s) engaged in actual combat, the duration for which combat was sustained, and a detailed description of the actions against the enemy. The Chairman of the Joint Chiefs of Staff was the approving authority for the specific battle stars.

To date there have been no battle stars authorized for the Global War on Terrorism Service Medal. The Military Decorations and Awards Review Results released in January 2016 resolved to "eliminate authority for battle stars" in regard to the GWOT-SM.

See also

Awards and decorations of the United States military
Afghanistan Campaign Medal
Iraq Campaign Medal
Global War on Terrorism Expeditionary Medal

Notes

References

Further reading
Executive Order 13289: Establishing the Global War on Terrorism Medals (PDF)
White House press release

External links
Official website

Awards established in 2003
United States service medals
War on terror